Santos Futebol Clube ( Santos Football Club), also known as Santos  and familiarly as Peixe, was a Brazilian professional futsal club, based in Santos, Brazil. They play in the Liga Futsal, Brazil's national league.

History
Santos Futebol Clube was founded on April 14, 1912. The futsal department was created in 2011, after a partnership between Santos Futebol Clube and Cortiana Plásticos. Falcão has been signed for the club, to play for two seasons. They won the Copa Gramado in 2011, after beating Krona Futsal 3-1 on March 3, 2011. Santos debuted in the 2011 Liga Futsal on March 14, 2011, against Krona Futsal, at Ginásio da Univille, in Joinville, Santa Catarina. They beat Krona Futsal 3-2. Santos won the 2011 liga Futsal after beating Carlos Barbosa on penalties. Due to lack of funds, the club was dissolved on December 27, 2011.

Achievements
 Liga Futsal:
 Winners (1): 2011
 Copa Gramado:
 Winners (1): 2011

Arena
Santos Futebol Clube played their home games at Arena Santos. The stadium has a maximum capacity of 5,000 people.

References

External links
 Official website

Futsal clubs established in 2011
Sports clubs disestablished in 2011
Defunct futsal clubs
Futsal clubs in Brazil
Santos FC
2011 establishments in Brazil
2011 disestablishments in Brazil